The Hillcrest Centre is a community centre with ice hockey and curling rinks, and an aquatics facility, located at Hillcrest Park in Vancouver, British Columbia, Canada. Construction started in March 2007; it hosted the 2009 World Junior Curling Championships prior to the Olympics. During the 2010 Olympics, it was named the Vancouver Olympic/Paralympic Centre and had a capacity of 6,000 people to host curling at the 2010 Winter Olympics; for the 2010 Paralympics, it hosted the Wheelchair Curling event.

Design

Sustainability features
The centre was built to qualify for the Leadership in Energy and Environmental Design Scale (LEED) Gold certification; for example, the centre's refrigeration plant is designed to heat other areas of the building and the adjacent aquatic centre through the utilization of what is otherwise waste heat from cooling the ice surface. Surrounding ground water will also be collected for use in the facility's toilets.

Smart site selection is key to maintaining the centre's green footprint; the new facility replaces a much older community complex, with the new curling complex being built on what was a gravel parking lot. Federal (CEAA) environmental assessment review process was also applied to the selection of the site. Trees that were affected during the construction of the venue were moved to other areas of the park, and any land created from the demolition of the old community centre will be turned into community green space during post-Games conversion.

Aboriginal participation
Aboriginal artwork was installed at the venue as part of the Vancouver 2010 Venues Aboriginal Arts Program. Featured art includes traditional, and contemporary artwork by First Nations, Inuit and Metis artists from across Canada.

Post Olympics
After the 2010 Olympic games, the centre was converted into a multi-purpose recreation centre that includes a hockey rink, gymnasium, library, eight sheets of curling ice and a lounge for the curlers. Connected to the facility via an indoor concourse will is the Percy Norman Aquatic Centre, which features a leisure tank, a 50m lap pool and an outdoor aquatic area.

References

Venues of the 2010 Winter Olympics
Olympic curling venues
Indoor arenas in British Columbia
Sports venues in Vancouver
Curling venues in Canada
Curling in British Columbia
2009 establishments in British Columbia
Sports venues completed in 2009